Akademy (capitalized as aKademy before 2009) is an annual contributors and users conference of the KDE community. Akademy is held at varying venues in Europe.

While Akademy usually takes place late summer or early autumn and is always held in Europe, Camp KDE, another contributors conference of the KDE community, is held in the Americas.

Format 

The numbers below are the participation at the Akademy 2008.

 Two-day KDE conference, 350 people.
 One-day KDE e.V. meeting, 100 people.
 Five-day hacking session, 350 people at the start, 250 people at the end.
 Social program like a reception, party and optionally a sight-seeing tour.

Conference history

Akademy Awards 

The yearly Akademy conference gives Akademy Awards, are awards that the KDE community gives to KDE contributors. There are three awards, best application, best non-application and jury's award.

KDE One 
KDE One is the first KDE community meeting with 15 participants, and budget is 14000 DEM (7158 EUR). The results of discussions are: KParts for embedding applications into each other, definition of a filesystem standard, all applications should be internationalized, need a list of keybindings that are obligatory for all applications, and need more and better documentation. The social event is a walk through the historical town of Arnsberg. The sponsors helped with money donations consists of S.u.S.E. GmbH, Caldera Inc., LST Software GmbH, O'Reilly Verlag, JF Lehmanns Buchhandlung, Delix Computer GmbH, Dorint Hotel Arnsberg-Neheim, and Wirtschaftsförderung Arnsberg GmbH.

KDE Two 
KDE Two is the second KDE community meeting with 40 participants, organized by SuSE and Caldera. KDE e.V. meeting elect the new board consists of Kurt Granroth (president), Chris Schläger (vice president), Mirko Boehm (treasurer), and Preston Brown (board member).

Kastle 
The KDE Contributor Conference (code-named Kastle) was held at the Zámek (Castle) in Nové Hrady, Czech Republic. The conference program consists of KDE e.V. membership meeting, technical Talks, brewery tour, and hacking festival. The conference is run by KDE e.V., the Academic and University Center Nove Hrady and the Polytechnic University of Upper Austria in Hagenberg.

Conferences

aKademy 2004 
The KDE Community World Summit 2004 (code-named aKademy) take place at the Filmakademie Ludwigsburg. The conference is jointly organized by KDE e.V., Wirtschaftsförderung Region Stuttgart (WRS), and Linux New Media AG.

aKademy 2005 

The KDE Developers and Users Conference 2005 (code-named aKademy) take place at the University of Málaga. KDE e.V. Meeting take place at 26 August. KDE User and Administrator Conference takes place at 27 to 28 August. KDE Developers and Contributors Conference takes place at 29 to 30 August. Coding Marathon for KDE Developers and Contributors takes place at 31 August to 4 September.

aKademy 2006 
The aKademy 2006 takes place in Trinity College Dublin. The conference was focused on KDE SC 4, desktop standards and cross-project collaboration, and meeting the community.

aKademy 2007 
The aKademy 2007 takes place at the Graham Hills Building, University of Strathclyde.

Akademy 2008 
The Akademy 2008 takes place at Campus De Nayer, Lessius Hogeschool.

Akademy 2010 

The Akademy 2010 was held in the main building of the University of Tampere from July 2–9, 2010.

Akademy 2017 
The Akademy 2017 was held in Universidad de Almería (UAL) in Almería, Spain, from July 22–27, 2017.

Stalls at the conference were held by LibreOffice, Slimbook, and SUSE, among others.

Akademy 2018 
The Akademy 2018 was held at TU Wien in Vienna, Austria, from Saturday 11th to Friday 17 August.

Akademy-es 

Akademy-es is a conference for Spanish community since 2006, aimed at Spanish speakers. The event is organized by Spanish local organization. KDE España organizes the event since 2008. The annual KDE España Assembly takes place during the event.

Akademy-es 2006 was held at Espai Jove Bocanord in Barcelona, organized by Badopi. Akademy-es 2007 was hosted by Hispalinux, Wireless Zaragoza, and the Zaragoza council. Akademy-es 2008 was held at University of A Coruña, was organized by the KDE España and GPUL, sponsored by Oficina de Software Libre da Universidade da Coruña, Mancomun, Igalia, Qt Software and eyeOs. Akademy-es 2009 was held in the University of Las Palmas de Gran Canaria. Akademy-es 2010 was held in the Engineering Technical School of Bilbao, was organized by KDE España and Itsas. There were approximately 80 participants. The KDE España Assembly elected the new board consists of Albert Astals Cid (president), Rafael Fernández López (vice president), Aleix Pol (secretary), and José Millán Soto (treasurer). Akademy-es 2011 was organized by KDE España, was sponsored by Google and Nokia, and was supported by the Linux and Todo-Linux magazines. The event was held in two different locations: the Polytechnic University of Catalunya for presentations of first day, The School of Sant Marc de Sarrià for last two day.

Akademy-BR 

Akademy-BR is addressed to Brazilian community since 2010. The purpose of the meeting is to gather and organize ideas Brazilian developers on how to help KDE in Brazil. Akademy-BR 2010 was organized by the local group named LiveBlue. There were thirty participants from all over Brazil. Akademy-BR 2011 is organized by KDE-MG.

See also

 List of computer-related awards

References

External links
 Akademy website
 Camp KDE website
 Akademy-es 2011
 Akademy-BR 2011
 conf.kde.in
 Developer Sprints
 KDE Sprints

Free-software conferences
KDE
Free-software awards
Recurring events established in 1997
Articles containing video clips
1997 establishments in Germany